Brewcaria reflexa is a species of plants in the genus Brewcaria. This species is native to Venezuela and Colombia.

References

reflexa
Flora of Venezuela
Flora of Colombia
Plants described in 1954